Perlman syndrome (PS) (also called renal hamartomas, nephroblastomatosis and fetal gigantism) is a rare overgrowth disorder present at birth. It is characterized by polyhydramnios and fetal overgrowth, including macrocephaly, neonatal macrosomia, visceromegaly, dysmorphic facial features, and an increased risk for Wilms' tumor at an early age. The prognosis for Perlman syndrome is poor and it is associated with a high neonatal mortality.

Perlman syndrome is an uncommon genetic disorder grouped with overgrowth syndrome in which an abnormal increase is often noted at birth in the size of the body or a body part of the infant. The disorder, also called renal hamartomas, nephroblastomatosis and fetal gigantism, has also been grouped with Renal cell carcinoma. The characteristic features include polyhydramnios, fetal overgrowth, including macrocephaly, neonatal macrosomia, visceromegaly, dysmorphic facial features, and an increased risk for Wilms' tumor at an early age.

Signs and symptoms

Genetics 

The gene thought to cause some of the cases of Perlman syndrome is DIS3L2 found on chromosome 2 at 2q37.2 and is thought to have an important role in the mitotic cell cycle. Although both sexes are affected, the sex ratio of male to female is 2:1. The syndrome has been described in both consanguineous and non-consanguineous couplings.
No chromosomal abnormalities have been observed, except for in the case of Chernos et al., which showed a de novo mutation — an extra G positive band, a genetic mutation that neither parent possessed nor transmitted — on the tip of the short arm of chromosome 11.

Diagnosis
The diagnosis of Perlman syndrome is based on observed phenotypic features and confirmed by histological examination of the kidneys. Prenatal diagnosis is possible for families that have a genetic disposition for Perlman syndrome although there is no conclusive laboratory test to confirm the diagnosis. Fetal overgrowth, particularly with an occipitofrontal circumference (OFC) greater than the 90th centile for gestational age, as well as an excess of amniotic fluid in the amniotic sac (polyhydramnios), may be the first signs of Perlman. Using ultrasound diagnosis, Perlman syndrome has been detected at 18 weeks. During the first trimester, the common abnormalities of the syndrome observed by ultrasound include cystic hygroma and a thickened nuchal lucency. Common findings for the second and third trimesters include macrosomia, enlarged kidneys, renal tumors (both hamartoma and Wilms), cardiac abnormalities and visceromegaly.

Prompt recognition and identification of the disorder along with accurate follow-up and clinical assistance is recommended as the prognosis for Perlman is severe and associated with a high neonatal death rate.

Differential diagnosis
Perlman syndrome shares clinical overlaps with other overgrowth disorders, with similarities to Beckwith–Wiedemann syndrome and Simpson–Golabi–Behmel syndrome having been particularly emphasized in scientific study. Similarities with Beckwith-Wiedemann syndrome include polyhydramnios, macrosomia, nephromegaly and hypoglycaemia. It is the distinctive facial dysmorphology of Perlman, including deep-set eyes, depressed nasal bridge, everted upper lip, and macrocephaly which allows the two conditions to be distinguished from one another. Diagnosis of Perlman syndrome also overlaps with other disorders associated with Wilms tumor, namely, Sotos syndrome and Weaver syndrome.

Treatment

Treatment apparently includes seeking an acting career that utilizes your unique characteristics to carry the plot line.

Epidemiology 
Perlman syndrome is a rare disease with an estimated incidence of less than 1 in 1,000,000. As of 2008, fewer than 30 patients had ever been reported in the world literature.

See also 
 Beckwith–Wiedemann syndrome
 Multiple abnormalities
 Renal cell carcinoma

References

External links 

Genetic disorders with OMIM but no gene
Rare syndromes
Syndromes affecting head size
Syndromes with craniofacial abnormalities
Syndromes with tumors